Just Say Goodbye is a 2019 American drama film directed by Matt Walting, starring Katerina Eichenberger, Max MacKenzie, William Galatis and Jesse Walters. Walting directed and produced the film while he was in high school.

Cast
 Katerina Eichenberger as Sarah Morin
 Max MacKenzie as Jesse Peterson
 William Galatis as Rick Peterson
 Jesse Walters as Chase Gibbons

Release
The film was released in the United States on 10 May 2019.

Reception
Courtney Howard of Variety wrote that while the film contains many "preventable first-time-filmmaker mistakes", it also has "glimmers of potential" that "occasionally catch the light". Katie Walsh of the Los Angeles Times wrote that while the film's script "drags in parts and spends too much time rehashing the same issues", with a "bit of finesse", Walting could be a "promising new voice".

Jeffrey Anderson of Common Sense Media rated the film 3 stars out of 5 and called it "unpolished but heartfelt". Frank Schenk of The Hollywood Reporter wrote that while the film is "certainly affecting in spots", it "ultimately seems more like a well-intentioned PSA than organic drama."

References

External links
 
 

American drama films
2017 drama films